Northern Motorway may refer to one of several roads in New Zealand:

Auckland Northern Motorway
Christchurch Northern Motorway
Dunedin Northern Motorway